The Gita Govinda is a work composed by the 12th-century Hindu poet, Jayadeva. It describes the relationship between Krishna, Radha and gopis (female cow herders) of Vrindavan.

The Gita Govinda is organized into twelve chapters. Each chapter is further sub-divided into one or more divisions called prabandhas, totalling twenty-four in all. The prabandhas contain couplets grouped into eights, called ashtapadis. The text also elaborates the eight moods of Heroine, the Ashta Nayika, which has been an inspiration for many compositions and choreographic works in Indian classical dances. Musicians of Kerala have adapted the ashtapadis into a musical form performed in temples called sopana sangeetham.

Summary

The work delineates the love of Krishna for Radha, the milkmaid, his faithlessness and subsequent return to her, and is taken as symbolical of the human soul's straying from its true allegiance but returning at length to the God which created it.

Chapters 

 Sāmodadāmodaram (Exuberant Krishna)
 Akleshakeshavam (Blithesome Krishna)
 Mugdhamadhusūdanam (Winsome Krishna)
 Snigdhamadhusūdanam (Tender Krishna)
 Sākāṅkṣa puṇdarīkākṣham (Passionate Krishna)
 Dhrṣta vaikuṇṭa (Audacious Krishna)
 NāgaranārāyanaH (Dexterous Krishna)
 VilakṣyalakṣmīpatiH (Apologetic Krishna)
 Mugdhadamukunda (Unpretentious Krishna)
 ChaturachaturbhujaH (Tactful Krishna)
 Sānandadāmodaram (Joyful Krishna)
 SuprītapītāmbaraH (Exultant Krishna)

Translations

The poem has been translated into most modern Indian languages and many European languages. There is a German rendering which Goethe read by F. H . van Dalberg. Dalberg's version was based on the English translation done by William Jones published in the Transactions of the Asiatic Society, Calcutta in 1792. A verse translation by the German poet Friedrich Rückert was begun in 1829 and revised according to the edited Sanskrit and Latin translations of C. Lassen in Bonn 1837. There's also another manuscript at the Guimet Museum in Paris in Devanagari script narrating the love between Krishna and Radha. This oblong work is printed on paper in nagari script on seven lines per page, and has a foliation located in the left margin on the reverse. It is made up of 36 folios. This volume is decorated with a snow crystal motif scattered throughout the text, a practice typical of the Indian publisher Baburam. This edition was produced in Calcutta in 1808, in imitation of the manuscripts; devoid of title page, it is accompanied by a colophon. The present binding, executed at the museum in 1991, constitutes a reproduction very faithful to its original appearance.

Notable English translations are: Edwin Arnold's The Indian Song of Songs (1875); Sri Jayadevas Gita Govinda: The loves of Krisna and Radha (Bombay 1940) by George Keyt and Harold Peiris; S. Lakshminarasimha Sastri The Gita Govinda of Jayadeva, Madras, 1956; Duncan Greenlee's Theosophical rendering The Song of the Divine, Madras, 1962; Monica Varma's transcreation The Gita Govinda of Jayadeva published by Writer's Workshop, Calcutta, 1968; Barbara Stoler Miller's Jayadeva's Gitagovinda : Love song of the Dark Lord published by Oxford University Press, Delhi,1978; Lee Siegel's Gitagovinda: Love Songs of Radha and Krishna published in the Clay Sanskrit series.

The first English translation of the Gita Govinda was written by Sir William Jones in 1792, where Cenduli (Kenduli Sasana) of Calinga (Kalinga, ancient Odisha) is referred to as the widely-believed to be the place of Jayadeva's origin and that the poet himself mentions this. Since then, the Gita Govinda has been translated to many languages throughout the world, and is considered to be among the finest examples of Sanskrit poetry. Barbara Stoler Miller translated the book in 1977 as Love Song of the Dark Lord: Jayadeva's Gita Govinda. The book contains a foreword by John Stratton Hawley and includes extensive commentary on the verse and topic of the poem.

Music 
Gita Govinda is one of the earliest musical texts in which the author indicates the exact raga (mode) and tala (rhythm) in which to sing each of the songs. These indications have been compiled below according to the ashtapadi number, based on the important ancient copies of the Gita Govinda and its commentaries such as Sarvangasundari Tika of Narayana Dasa (14th century), Dharanidhara's Tika (16th century), Jagannatha Mishra's Tika (16th century), Rasikapriya of Rana Kumbha (16th century) and Arthagobinda of Bajuri Dasa (17th century).

 Mālava, Mālavagauḍa or Mālavagauḍā
 Maṅgala Gujjarī or Gurjarī
 Basanta
 Rāmakirī or Rāmakerī
 Gujjarī or Gurjarī
 Guṇḍakirī or Guṇḍakerī or Mālavagauḍa
 Gujjarī or Gurjarī
 Karṇṇāṭa
 Deśākhya or Deśākṣa
 Deśī Barāḍi or Deśa Barāḍi or Pañchama Barāḍi
 Gujjarī or Gurjarī
 Guṇḍakirī or Guṇḍakerī
 Mālava or Mālavagauḍā
 Basanta
 Gujjarī or Gurjarī
 Barāḍi or Deśa Barāḍi or Deśī Barāḍi
 Bhairabī
 Gujjarī or Gurjarī or Rāmakerī
 Deśī or Deśa Barāḍi
 Basanta
 Barāḍi or Deśa Barāḍi
 Barāḍi
 Rāmakirī or Rāmakerī or Bibhāsa
 Rāmakirī or Rāmakerī

Most of the ragas and talas indicated by Jayadeva, with the exception of one or two, continue to be in practice in the tradition of Odissi music.

Gita Govinda at Museums 
Various Gita Govinda Miniature paintings in museums:

 National Museum, New Delhi
 Honolulu Museum of Art
 Prince of Wales Museum, Bombay
 Metropolitan Museum of art
 Indian Museum, Calcutta
 Govt. Museum and Art Gallery Chandigarh
 Rietberg Museum
 Guimet Museum

Publications
in English

See also

 Works of Jayadeva
 List of Sanskrit poets
Odissi music

References

External links

 Shreegitagobinda O Mahakabi Shreejaydev : A Book
The Gita Govinda: a Multimedia Presentation

Hindu texts
Sanskrit poetry
Jayadeva
Bhakti movement
Medieval Indian literature
Vaishnavism
Krishna
Odissi music
Odissi music repertoire